Pelle Gudmundsen-Holmgreen (21 November 1932 – 27 June 2016) was a Danish composer.

Biography
Pelle Gudmundsen-Holmgreen was born in Copenhagen, Denmark, and was the son of the sculptor Jørgen Gudmundsen-Holmgreen. He studied at the Royal Danish Academy of Music in Copenhagen, with Finn Høffding, Svend Westergaard, Bjørn Hjelmborg, and Vagn Holmboe (instrumentation), graduating in 1958.

Amongst other works, he composed fourteen string quartets and a Concerto Grosso for string quartet and orchestra, written for the Kronos Quartet, which he referred to as "Vivaldi on Safari".

He won the Nordic Council Music Prize in 1980 for his Symfoni/Antifoni.

Gudmundsen-Holmgreen died in Copenhagen of cancer on 26 June 2016.

Sources

External links
Pelle Gudmundsen-Holmgreen page on André Chaudron's Contemporary Music site
Profile and works at Edition Wilhelm Hansen

1932 births
2016 deaths
20th-century classical composers
21st-century classical composers
Danish classical composers
Danish male classical composers
Musicians from Copenhagen
Royal Danish Academy of Music alumni
Pupils of Finn Høffding
Pupils of Vagn Holmboe
20th-century Danish male musicians
21st-century male musicians